Clinton Lake may refer to:

 Clinton Lake (Kansas)
 Clinton Lake (Illinois)